Ruben Katoatau (born 9 February 1997 in Nauru) is a Kiribati weightlifter.

His height is 158 cm for a weight of 68 kg. He finished 6th at Weightlifting Men's 69 kg in Gold Coast at the 2018 Commonwealth Games.

Achievements
His previous main results were:
2017	Gold Coast, AUS	Men's 69 kg	7th	117	152	269
2016	Penang, MAS	Men's 62 kg	7th	110	147	257
2015	Pune, IND	Men's 69 kg	8th	107	135	242
2014 at the 2014 Summer Youth Olympics.

Then, he participated at the 2019 World Weightlifting Championships – Men's 67 kg (snatch 30th).

His elder brother David Katoatau represented Kiribati in weightlifting, and was the first ever gold medallist of his country at the Glasgow 2014 Commonwealth Games (men's 105 kg), and has competed at three Olympic Games (2008, 2012, 2016).

At the IWF Absolute Continental Ranking – Oceania he finished just behind a Samoan weightlifter, which withdraw from the 2020 Olympic Games. Katoatau will replace him at 2020 Summer Olympics, in the men's 67 kg category.

References

External links
 

Living people
1997 births
I-Kiribati male weightlifters
Weightlifters at the 2018 Commonwealth Games
Weightlifters at the 2014 Summer Youth Olympics
Commonwealth Games competitors for Kiribati
Weightlifters at the 2020 Summer Olympics
Olympic weightlifters of Kiribati
Weightlifters at the 2022 Commonwealth Games